Andrew Garcia (born 1985) is an American singer.

Andrew Garcia may also refer to:

Drew Garcia (Andrew James Garcia, born 1986), American baseball player
Andrew Garcia (1853–1943), author and Montana mountain man, Tough Trip Through Paradise

See also
Andy García (born 1956), actor
Andy García (soccer) (born 1995), American soccer player